Ramón Duvalón (born August 31, 1954) is a retired boxer from Cuba, who represented his native country at the 1976 Summer Olympics in Montreal, Quebec, Canada. There he won the silver medal in the flyweight division (– 51 kg) after being defeated in the final by United States-boxer Leo Randolph. A year earlier he captured the gold at the 1975 Pan American Games.

Olympic results 
1st round bye
Defeated Souley Hancaradu (Nigeria) walk-over, country boycotted over New Zealand
Defeated Toshinori Koga (Japan) 5-0
Defeated Ian Clyde (Canada) 5-0
Defeated David Torosyan (Soviet Union) DQ 2
Lost to Leo Randolph (United States) 2-3

References
 databaseOlympics
 sports-reference

1954 births
Living people
Flyweight boxers
Boxers at the 1976 Summer Olympics
Olympic boxers of Cuba
Olympic silver medalists for Cuba
Olympic medalists in boxing
Cuban male boxers
Medalists at the 1976 Summer Olympics
Boxers at the 1975 Pan American Games
Pan American Games gold medalists for Cuba
Pan American Games medalists in boxing
Medalists at the 1975 Pan American Games
20th-century Cuban people